The 1901 Washington & Jefferson Red and Black football team was an American football team that represented Washington & Jefferson College as an independent during the 1911 college football season. Led by N. S. Knight in his first and only year as head coach, the team compiled a 6–2–2 record and outscored opponents by a total of 125 to 39.

Schedule

References

Washington and Jefferson
Washington & Jefferson Presidents football seasons
Washington and Jefferson Red and Black football